Frank Bain (born 10 June 1959) is  a former Australian rules footballer who played with Richmond in the Victorian Football League (VFL).

Notes

External links 
		

Living people
1959 births
Australian rules footballers from Victoria (Australia)
Richmond Football Club players